John Bowe (14 July 1911 – 12 April 1990) was an Australian rules footballer who played with South Melbourne in the VFL. He played on the wing in the club's 1933 Grand Final win over Richmond.

The collection of players recruited from interstate in 1932/1933 became known as South Melbourne's "Foreign Legion".

Bowe was recruited from Subiaco in the West Australian Football League (WAFL) and returned to the club after playing for South Melbourne in 1933.  He won Subiaco's best and fairest award in 1934.  He captained Western Australian in a state game in 1936 and was appointed as coach of South Fremantle in 1941.

References

External links

1911 births
1990 deaths
Australian rules footballers from Western Australia
Sydney Swans players
Sydney Swans Premiership players
Subiaco Football Club players
South Fremantle Football Club coaches
One-time VFL/AFL Premiership players